The 22nd CARIFTA Games was held in Fort-de-France, Martinique, on April 10–11, 1993.

Participation (unofficial)

Detailed result lists can be found on the "World Junior Athletics History" website.  An unofficial count yields the number of about 272 athletes (175 junior (under-20) and 97 youth (under-17)) from about 19 countries:   Antigua and Barbuda (3), Bahamas (28), Barbados (32), Belize (1), Bermuda (13), British Virgin Islands (7), Cayman Islands (2), Dominica (1), French Guiana (4), Grenada (8), Guadeloupe (26), Guyana (5), Jamaica (54), Martinique (36), Saint Kitts and Nevis (7), Saint Lucia (12), Saint Vincent and the Grenadines (1), Trinidad and Tobago (29), US Virgin Islands (3).

Austin Sealy Award

The Austin Sealy Trophy for the most outstanding athlete of the games was awarded to Nikole Mitchell from Jamaica.  She won 3 gold medals (100m, 200m, and 4 × 100m relay) in the junior
(U-20) category.

Medal summary
Medal winners are published by category: Boys under 20 (Junior), Girls under 20 (Junior), Boys under 17 (Youth), and Girls under 17 (Youth).
Complete results can be found on the "World Junior Athletics History"
website.

Boys under 20 (Junior)

Girls under 20 (Junior)

Boys under 17 (Youth)

Girls under 17 (Youth)

Medal table (unofficial)

References

External links
World Junior Athletics History

CARIFTA Games
1993 in Martinique
CARIFTA
CARIFTA
International sports competitions hosted by Martinique
Athletics competitions in Martinique